Tyler Moore (born January 3, 1993) is an American football offensive guard who is currently a free agent. He played college football for the Florida Gators. He played in the 2011 U.S. Army All-American Bowl. He played high school football for Countryside High School.

Professional career

Tampa Bay Storm
Moore was assigned to the Tampa Bay Storm on June 2, 2015. On April 29, 2016, Moore was placed on reassignment. On May 4, 2016, Moore was assigned to the Storm again. On May 9, 2016, he placed on reassignment. On May 18, 2016, he was assigned to the Tampa Bay Storm. On May 21, 2016, he was placed on reassignment.

Chicago Bears
On July 31, 2015, Moore was signed by the Chicago Bears. On September 5, 2015, he was released by the Bears.

References

External links 
Nebraska Bio

1993 births
Living people
Nebraska Cornhuskers football players
Florida Gators football players
Tampa Bay Storm players
Chicago Bears players